Red Guards largely comprised students during China's Cultural Revolution.

Red Guard(s) or Redguards may also refer to:

Communist and socialist groups
 Worker-Peasant Red Guards, militia in North Korea
 Red Guards (Russia), during the Russian Revolution and the Russian Civil War
 Red Guards (Finland), during the Finnish Civil War
 Red Guard Party, a militant Chinese-American civil rights group closely modeled after the Black Panthers
 Red Guards (Bavaria), in the Bavarian Soviet Republic
 Red Guards (Hungary), in the Hungarian Soviet Republic (1918–1919)
 Red Guards (Italy), during the Biennio Rosso
 Young Red Guards Cadet Corps, a paramilitary unit in North Korea
 Red Guards (USA), American Marxist–Leninist–Maoist collectives
 Red Guards (Ceylon), military wing of the Janatha Vimukthi Peramuna

Other groups
 Red Guard of Senegal, a gendarmerie in charge of presidential security

Fictional uses
 Red Guards (Emperor's Royal Guard), fictional elite Imperial corps of the Star Wars universe
 The Red Guard (novel), a 1967 novel in the Killmaster series of spy novels
 Redguards, a fantasy race of The Elder Scrolls universe
 The Elder Scrolls Adventures: Redguard, a 1998 computer game based on The Elder Scrolls universe

See also
 Red Army (disambiguation)
 Red Scare
 Red Squad